Phloeonomus is a genus of ocellate rove beetles in the family Staphylinidae. There are about eight described species in Phloeonomus.

Species
These eight species belong to the genus Phloeonomus:
 Phloeonomus flavipennis (Méklin, 1853) g
 Phloeonomus laesicollis (Maklin, 1852) g b
 Phloeonomus minimus (Erichson, 1839) g
 Phloeonomus pedicularius (Erichson, 1840) g
 Phloeonomus punctipennis Thomson, 1867 g
 Phloeonomus pusillus (Gravenhorst, 1806) g
 Phloeonomus sjobergi Strand, 1937 g
 Phloeonomus suffusus (Casey, 1894) b
Data sources: i = ITIS, c = Catalogue of Life, g = GBIF, b = Bugguide.net

References

Further reading

External links

 

Omaliinae